Canada national rugby team  may refer to:

 Canada national rugby league team, represents Canada at rugby league, nicknamed the Wolverines
 Canada national rugby union team, represents Canada at rugby union, nicknamed the Canucks